Inédits is an album by French rock band Magma. It was released in 1977 and features unreleased pieces and music that would eventually be used in the band's 2004 studio album K.A. (Kohntarkosz Anteria). The album was first released on Tapioca, then on LTM, and more recently on Seventh. It is noted for its poor sound quality.

Track listing

Personnel 
 Klaus Blasquiz – vocals, percussion (1, 2, 3, 4, 5, 6)
 René Garber – vocals, contrabass clarinet (5, 6)
 Louis Toesca – trumpet (5)
 Teddy Lasry – saxes (5)
 Jeff Seffer – saxes (5)
 Didier Lockwood – violin (3)
 Gabriel Federow – guitar (3)
 Claude Olmos – guitar (1, 4)
 Marc Fosset – guitar (6)
 Jean-Luc Manderlier – keyboards (5, 6)
 Michel Grailler – keyboards (1, 2, 4)
 Benoît Widemann – keyboards (3)
 Jean-Pol Asseline – keyboards (3)
 Francois Cahen – keyboards (5)
 Gerard Bikialo – keyboards (1, 2, 4, 6)
 Francis Moze – bass (5)
 Jean-Pierre Lembert – bass (6)
 Jannick "Janik" Top – bass (1, 2, 4)
 Bernard Paganotti – bass (3)
 Christian Vander – drums, voice  (1, 2, 3, 4, 5, 6)

References

Magma (band) albums
1977 live albums